Soskice is a surname. Notable people with the surname include: 

David Soskice (born 1942), British political economist and academic
Frank Soskice (1902–1979), British lawyer and politician
Janet Soskice (born 1951), British theologian and philosopher
Juliet Soskice (1881–1944), British translator and writer